In enzymology, an adenosylmethionine hydrolase is an enzyme that catalyzes the chemical reaction

S-adenosyl-L-methionine + H2O  L-homoserine + methylthioadenosine

Thus, the two substrates of this enzyme are S-adenosyl-L-methionine and H2O, whereas its two products are L-homoserine and methylthioadenosine.

This enzyme belongs to the family of hydrolases, specifically those acting on ether bonds involving sulfur (thioether and trialkylsulfonium hydrolases).  The systematic name of this enzyme class is S-adenosyl-L-methionine hydrolase. Other names in common use include S-adenosylmethionine cleaving enzyme, methylmethionine-sulfonium-salt hydrolase, and adenosylmethionine lyase.

References

 

EC 3.3.1
Enzymes of unknown structure